Outlook Peak is a mountain in Qikiqtaaluk, Nunavut, Canada, located on the southwestern edge of the Muller Icecap. It is the highest mountain of the Princess Margaret Range at 2,210 m (7,251 ft), and the highest on Axel Heiberg Island, as well as the fourth highest in Nunavut.

See also
List of summits of North American islands
List of islands by highest point
List of the most prominent summits of North America

References

External links

 Peakbagger.com: Outlook Peak, Nunavut

Arctic Cordillera
Mountains of Qikiqtaaluk Region
Two-thousanders of Nunavut